Yvonne Jean Jones  (born March 15, 1968) is a Canadian politician in Newfoundland and Labrador, who was elected to the House of Commons of Canada in a by-election on May 13, 2013. She represents the district of Labrador as a member of the Liberal Party caucus. On December 2, 2015, she was appointed Parliamentary Secretary to the Minister of Indigenous and Northern Affairs. Jones is a member of NunatuKavut.

From 1996 to 2013, Jones represented the district of Cartwright-L'Anse au Clair in the Newfoundland and Labrador House of Assembly. During her career in provincial politics, she served as Minister of Fisheries in Premier Roger Grimes' government, and later as a leader of the Liberal Party of Newfoundland and Labrador and Leader of the Official Opposition.

Provincial politics
Jones has training in journalism and has worked for many community newspapers throughout the province. She has also served as an employment counselor and field worker for the Battle Harbour Development Association with Human Resources Development Canada.

Jones served as mayor of Mary's Harbour, Labrador from 1991 to 1996. In 1996, she sought the Liberal Party nomination for the provincial electoral district of Cartwright-L'Anse au Clair in that year's general election. Jones lost the nomination to incumbent Danny Dumaresque, but subsequently ran as an Independent candidate. She was elected to the House of Assembly in the 1996 general election, defeating Dumaresque, a two-term MHA. Jones became the Liberal Party's candidate for the 1999 election. She was re-elected in 1999, 2003, 2007 and 2011.

After serving two years as a Parliamentary Secretary Jones was appointed to cabinet In February 2003, by Premier Roger Grimes. She was sworn in as the Minister of Fisheries and Aquaculture and as the Minister Responsible for the Status of Women. Jones held the post till the Liberal government was defeated in the provincial election in October of that year.

In 2004, Jones was the only member of the House of Assembly to vote against the Labrador Inuit Land Claims Agreement (Bill 44). During the legislative debate Jones stated "The proposed treaty we have before us today is very complex. I certainly do not think and I know it was not the intention of the LIA [Labrador Inuit Association] to stigmatize or exclude the possibility for settlement of a claim with Metis people. I know that, Mr. Speaker. I have asked the government to give me the greatest assurances possible that this treaty would not prejudice the future acceptance of a claim for Metis in Labrador. Those assurances have not been satisfactory to the leadership of the Labrador Metis Nation, to their President, Todd Russell, to their elders and their members, and therefore, Mr. Speaker, it is not satisfactory to me". During this debate Jones also stated "I am a Metis and I am very proud of who I am. I am descendant from the bloodline of Inuit and the English".

Jones was an outspoken critic of the Muskrat Falls hydro development.

Liberal leader
Jones was one of only three Liberal Members of the House of Assembly (MHA) re-elected in the 2007 provincial election. On November 15, 2007, she was named the interim leader of the Liberal Party and Official Opposition Leader, after party leader Gerry Reid was defeated in his own district. Jones became the first woman to lead the Liberal Party in the province. The party originally planned to hold a leadership convention to select a new, permanent leader in 2008, but postponed the vote twice. Jones continued to serve as interim leader during this period of time, and in December 2009, announced her intention to run for the permanent leadership when the convention was to be scheduled. On July 30, 2010, Jones was acclaimed Liberal leader after she was the only person to file nomination papers for the position.

She was expected to be sworn in as leader at the party's convention in November of that year, however the convention was delayed when Jones announced in August that she would be taking a leave of absence from her position to undergo treatment for breast cancer. She returned to work in early 2011, and was sworn in as Liberal leader at the party's Spring leadership convention.

By-elections
On October 27, 2009, the district of The Straits – White Bay North held a by-election, to replace Minister of Transportation and Works, Trevor Taylor, who resigned on October 2, 2009. Liberal candidate Marshall Dean won the election taking nearly 48% of the vote and defeating the Progressive Conservative candidate by 126 votes.

Public opinion
Under Jones' leadership the Liberal Party remained in second place in public opinion polls. After receiving 22% in the 2007 general election, the party's support has not risen above those levels. For the majority of time since the election their support has been in the mid-teens according to polls conducted by Corporate Research Associates (CRA). Jones' own popularity had consistently remained lower than her own party's; CRA's quarterly polls on Newfoundland and Labrador politics have found that no more than 11% of those surveyed have felt Jones would make the best premier. A NTV Telelink poll conducted in February 2011, found that 13% of decided voters would support the Liberal Party and that 12% thought Jones was the best choice to be premier.

The results of the NTV Telelink poll led former Liberal provincial and federal cabinet minister John Efford to criticize Jones's leadership. Efford said that Jones would not become premier and while he did not call on her to resign as leader, he did say that "it's clear what she ought to do in the face of poor polling results".

A CRA poll in March 2011, saw Jones' personal popularity rise to 18%, her highest level since becoming Liberal leader in 2007. Her personal popularity was also tied with that of her party. On June 7, 2011, CRA released a poll showing that Jones' popularity had dropped slightly to 16% but her party's support had risen to 22%. While the Progressive Conservatives still held a large lead in the poll, at 57%, the Liberals were statistically tied with the New Democrats, who had the support of 20% of those surveyed.

Resignation
On August 9, 2011, two months before the provincial election, Jones announced that she was resigning as leader due to a slower recovery from breast cancer than she expected. She sought re-election in her district during the 2011 provincial election, and won 71 per cent of the popular vote.

Federal politics
In April 2013, Jones resigned her seat in the Newfoundland and Labrador House of Assembly to run as the Liberal candidate in the federal by-election in Labrador created by the resignation of Peter Penashue. She defeated Penashue to win the seat on May 13, 2013. She was sworn in on June 4, 2013.

Upon her election, Jones was appointed the Liberal critic for Northern Development, the Northern Economic Development Agency, the Arctic Council, the Atlantic Canada Opportunities Agency, and Search and Rescue. In August 2013, Jones was elected Chair of the Liberal Party of Canada Newfoundland and Labrador caucus. In February 2014, she became Vice-Chair of the Public Accounts committee.

On December 2, 2015, Jones was appointed Parliamentary Secretary to the Minister of Indigenous and Northern Affairs.

In late August 2018, Jones was appointed as Parliamentary Secretary to the Minister of Intergovernmental and Northern affairs and Internal Trade.

Jones was re-elected in the 2019 federal election. On December 12, 2019, Jones was appointed Parliamentary Secretary to the Minister of Northern Affairs.

On April 19, 2021, Nunavut NDP MP Mumilaaq Qaqqaq claimed that Jones was "not an Inuk," and southern Labrador is "not an Inuit region". Jones dismissed Qaqqaq's comments as “immature and naïve”. Qaqqaq later issued an email statement apologizing “for how I handled the situation”.

Jones was re-elected in the 2021 federal election.

Electoral record

Federal

Provincial

|-

|-

|-
 
|NDP
|Bill Cooper
|align="right"|44
|align="right"|2.06
|align="right"|

|}

|-

|-

|}

|-

|-

|-

|}

|-

|-

|}

|-

|Independent
|Yvonne Jones
|align="right"|1,665
|align="right"|56.83%
|align="right"|
|-

|-

|}

References

External links

1968 births
Living people
Women government ministers of Canada
Women members of the House of Commons of Canada
Female Canadian political party leaders
Indigenous Members of the House of Commons of Canada
Inuit from Newfoundland and Labrador
Liberal Party of Canada MPs
Liberal Party of Newfoundland and Labrador MHAs
Mayors of places in Newfoundland and Labrador
Members of the Executive Council of Newfoundland and Labrador
Members of the House of Commons of Canada from Newfoundland and Labrador
Newfoundland and Labrador political party leaders
People from Labrador
Women MHAs in Newfoundland and Labrador
Women mayors of places in Newfoundland and Labrador
21st-century Canadian politicians
21st-century Canadian women politicians
Independent MHAs in Newfoundland and Labrador
Canadian Inuit women